The qualification for the 2020 women's Olympic water polo tournament  allocated ten teams quota spots: the hosts, the top team in the World League, the top team in the World Championships, five continental Olympic qualification tournament champions, and the two top teams at an Olympic qualifying tournament.

Qualification summary

2019 FINA World League

The best team in the 2019 World League qualified for the Olympics.

2019 World Championships

The top team in the 2019 World Championships qualified for the Olympics.

1 The United States qualified for the Olympics by winning the 2019 World League.

Continental tournaments
One team from each continental qualifying event qualifies for the Olympics.

Asia

Nur-Sultan, Kazakhstan, was supposed to host the Asian continental tournament from 12 to 16 February. In late January the event was cancelled as the Kazakh Government suspended all flights and visas from China due to concerns about the coronavirus pandemic in the Eastern part of the country. In mid-February AASF decided to use the final ranking of 2018 Asian Games to allocate its continental quotas to the winners and the slots in the WQT to the following teams in said ranking. The decision was later made official by FINA and the berths for the Olympic Games and for the WQT went to China and Kazakhstan respectively; since the remaining eligible teams from the Asian Games (Thailand, Indonesia and Hong Kong) all declined to participate in the WQT, FINA invited Uzbekistan.

1Japan qualified for the Olympics as host.

Europe

1 Spain qualified for the Olympics by finishing second in the 2019 World Championships.

Americas

1 The United States qualified for the Olympics by winning the 2019 World League.

World Qualification Tournament

The tournament was scheduled to be contested in Trieste, Italy, from 17 to 24 May but was postponed due to the COVID-19 pandemic. The draw of pools was held at FINA headquarters in Lausanne, Switzerland, on 11 February 2020. The top two teams qualified for the Olympics. It now takes place from 19 to 24 January 2021.

Participating teams

Final ranking

See also
Water polo at the 2020 Summer Olympics – Men's qualification

References

External links
FINA official website
IOC official website

Qualification for the 2020 Summer Olympics
W
Impact of the COVID-19 pandemic on the 2020 Summer Olympics